Christopher "Christo" Hand (1924 – February 2006) was an Irish Gaelic footballer who played as a left wing-back at senior level for the Meath county team.

Born in Ardcath, County Meath, Hand first arrived on the inter-county scene at the age of seventeen when he first linked up with the Meath minor team. He made his senior debut during the 1943 championship. Hand went on to play a key role for Meath for a decade, and won one All-Ireland medal, four Leinster medals and one National Football League medal. He was an All-Ireland runner-up on one occasion.

At club level Hand was a one-time championship medallist with Seán McDermott's in Dublin. He also won a championship medal with St Vincent's in Meath.

Hand retired from inter-county football following the conclusion of the 1953 championship.

Honours

Team

Seán McDermott's
Dublin Senior Football Championship (1): 1947

St Vincent's
Meath Senior Football Championship (1): 1955

Meath
All-Ireland Senior Football Championship (1): 1949
Leinster Senior Football Championship (4): 1947, 1949, 1951, 1952, 
National Football League (1): 1950–51

References

1924 births
2006 deaths
Leinster inter-provincial Gaelic footballers
Meath inter-county Gaelic footballers
St Vincent's (Meath) Gaelic footballers
Winners of one All-Ireland medal (Gaelic football)